Gorki is a rural locality (a selo) in Vtorovskoye Rural Settlement, Kameshkovsky District, Vladimir Oblast, Russia. The population was 61 as of 2010. There is 1 street.

Geography 
The village is located 19 km north-east from Vtorovo, 7 km south from Kameshkovo.

References 

Rural localities in Kameshkovsky District